Lucas is a city in Russell County, Kansas, United States.  As of the 2020 census, the population of the city was 332.

History
Lucas was established as the community of Blue Stem in 1877. It was renamed Lucas in 1887 after Lucas Place in St. Louis, Missouri.

Geography
Lucas is located at  (39.058839, -98.537457) at an elevation of 1,493 feet (455 m).

Wolf Creek, a tributary of the Saline River, flows east along the southern edge of the city.

Climate
The climate in this area is characterized by hot, humid summers and generally mild to cool winters.  According to the Köppen Climate Classification system, Lucas has a humid subtropical climate, abbreviated "Cfa" on climate maps.

Demographics

2010 census
As of the 2010 census, there were 393 people, 192 households, and 108 families residing in the city. The racial makeup of the city was 97.7% White, 0.8% Asian, 0.3% American Indian, 0.8% from some other race, and 0.5% from two or more races. Hispanics and Latinos of any race were 1.5% of the population.

There were 192 households, of which 22.4% had children under the age of 18 living with them, 47.9% were married couples living together, 2.1% had a male householder with no wife present, 6.3% had a female householder with no husband present, and 43.8% were non-families. 42.2% of all households were made up of individuals, and 20.3% had someone living alone who was 65 years of age or older. The average household size was 2.05, and the average family size was 2.79.

In the city, the population was spread out, with 21.1% under the age of 18, 5.6% from 18 to 24, 17.3% from 25 to 44, 29.8% from 45 to 64, and 26.2% who were 65 years of age or older. The median age was 49.5 years. For every 100 females, there were 88.0 males. For every 100 females age 18 and over, there were 82.4 males age 18 and over.

The median income for a household in the city was $30,368, and the median income for a family was $45,156. Males had a median income of $31,250 versus $23,333 for females. The per capita income for the city was $19,025. 6.7% of families and 14.6% of the population were below the poverty line, including 21.4% of those under age 18 and 16.3% of those age 65 or over.

2000 census
As of the census of 2000, there were 436 people, 180 households, and 113 families residing in the city. The racial makeup of the city was 97.71% White, 1.38% African American, and 0.92% from two or more races. Hispanic or Latino of any race were 0.46% of the population.

There were 180 households, out of which 23.9% had children under the age of 18 living with them, 56.7% were married couples living together, 5.6% had a female householder with no husband present, and 36.7% were non-families. 34.4% of all households were made up of individuals, and 20.6% had someone living alone who was 65 years of age or older. The average household size was 2.22 and the average family size was 2.85.

In the city the population was spread out, with 21.8% under the age of 18, 3.2% from 18 to 24, 18.8% from 25 to 44, 25.2% from 45 to 64, and 31.0% who were 65 years of age or older. The median age was 50 years. For every 100 females, there were 85.5 males. For every 100 females age 18 and over, there were 78.5 males.

Economy
As of 2012, 56.7% of the population over the age of 16 was in the labor force. 0.0% was in the armed forces, and 56.7% was in the civilian labor force with 55.6% being employed and 1.2% unemployed. The composition, by occupation, of the employed civilian labor force was:  33.2% in sales and office occupations; 21.7% in management, business, science, and arts; 21.3% in production, transportation, and material moving; 13.6% in natural resources, construction, and maintenance; and 10.2% in service occupations. The three industries employing the largest percentages of the working civilian labor force were:  educational services, and health care and social assistance (25.1%); manufacturing (21.3%); and retail trade (20.4%).

The cost of living in Lucas is relatively low; compared to a U.S. average of 100, the cost of living index for the community is 78.8. As of 2012, the median home value in the city was $56,000, the median selected monthly owner cost was $846 for housing units with a mortgage and $343 for those without, and the median gross rent was $419.

Government
Lucas is a city of the third class with a mayor-council form of government. The city council consists of five members, and it meets on the second Tuesday of each month.

Lucas lies within Kansas's 1st U.S. Congressional District. For the purposes of representation in the Kansas Legislature, the city is located in the 36th district of the Kansas Senate and the 109th district of the Kansas House of Representatives.

Education
The community is served by Sylvan–Lucas USD 299 public school district. Prior to 2010, it was served by Russell County USD 407. 

Lucas High School served the community until 1977. Lucas and Luray schools then united forming Lucas-Luray schools. In 2010, Lucas-Luray was united with Sylvan Unified schools to form Sylvan-Lucas Unified. The district operates one school in the city:  Lucas-Sylvan Unified Elementary School (Grades K-6). Local students in Grades 7-12 attend school in Sylvan Grove.

The Lucas High School mascot was Lucas Demons. Lucas-Luray High School mascot was Lucas-Luray Cougars. Sylvan-Lucas is the Mustangs.

Infrastructure

Transportation
K-18, an east-west route, approaches Lucas from the west, then turns southeast along the eastern side of the city. K-232, also known as the Post Rock Scenic Byway, a north-south route, terminates at its junction with K-18 southeast of the city.

Lucas Airport is located immediately east of the city. Publicly owned, it has one 2900' asphalt runway and is used for general aviation.

Utilities
The City of Lucas provides electricity to local residents. Wilson Telephone provides landline telephone service and offers cable television and internet access. Most residents use natural gas for heating fuel; service is provided by Kansas Gas Service.

Media
Lucas is in the Wichita-Hutchinson, Kansas television market.

Culture

Events
Each year on the Saturday before Labor Day weekend, the city holds its annual community celebration, the Adams Apple Festival. It includes an art show, a fun run, Scottish Highland Games, contests, and other entertainment. Other annual events include the Spook Parade, a children's costume contest held the Saturday before Halloween, and Santa Claus Day, held the Saturday before Christmas.

Since 1949, Lucas has hosted the K-18 Baseball state tournament. Named for Kansas Highway 18, which runs through town, the league consists of players ages 13-16 throughout communities in western and central Kansas. The K-18 softball state tournament began in 2020.

Points of interest
In 1996, Kansas Governor Bill Graves named Lucas the "Grassroots Art Capital of Kansas" due to the number of sites in the community devoted to local folk art. The Garden of Eden is a permanent outdoor sculpture exhibit built between 1905 and 1927 by local sculptor Samuel P. Dinsmoor. The site consists of Dinsmoor's home, a "log cabin" constructed of carved limestone, more than 150 sculptures representing his interpretation of the Biblical creation and world history, and a mausoleum housing the remains of Dinsmoor and his first wife. Inspired by Dinsmoor, local resident Florence Deeble constructed a rock garden around her home, using rocks acquired during her travels to construct works representing places she visited. Since 2002, Deeble's house has served as a gallery called the Garden of Isis, exhibiting works made from recycled materials by visual artist Mri-Pilar. The Grassroots Arts Center is a non-profit gallery located downtown which promotes and exhibits the work of Kansas folk artists. Other folk art sites in the city include late, porcelain artist, Eric Abraham's Flying Pig Studio & Gallery, The World's Largest Collection of the World's Smallest Version of the World's Largest Things traveling museum, Bowl Plaza, Miller's park, Fork Art Park, historical mural and the World's Largest Travel Plate.

Notable people
Notable individuals who were born in and/or have lived in Lucas include:
 Samuel P. Dinsmoor (1843-1932), sculptor
 Bill Volok (1910-1991), football tackle
 Erika Nelson (1972-), artist

See also
 Wilson Lake and Wilson State Park
 Meades Ranch Triangulation Station, the geodetic base point for the North American Datum of 1927 (NAD 27), which was used as a reference point until 1989.
 National Register of Historic Places listings in Russell County, Kansas

References

Further reading

External links

 Lucas Chamber of Commerce
 Lucas - Directory of Public Officials
 Grassroots Arts Center
 Florence Deeble's Rock Garden
 , from Hatteberg's People on KAKE TV news
 , from Hatteberg's People on KAKE TV news
 Lucas city map, KDOT

Cities in Kansas
Cities in Russell County, Kansas